The Georg Büchner Prize is the most important literary prize for German language literature, along with the Goethe Prize. The award is named after dramatist and writer Georg Büchner, author of Woyzeck and Leonce and Lena. The Georg Büchner Prize is awarded annually for authors "writing in the German language who have notably emerged through their oeuvre as essential contributors to the shaping of contemporary German cultural life".

History
The Georg Büchner Prize was created in 1923 in memory of Georg Büchner and was only given to artists who came from or were closely tied to Büchner's home of Hesse. It was first awarded in 1923. Among the early recipients were mostly visual artists, poets, actors, and singers.

In 1951, the prize changed to a general literary prize, awarded annually by the Deutsche Akademie für Sprache und Dichtung. It goes to German language authors, and the annual speech by the recipient takes place in Darmstadt. Since 2002, the prize has been endowed with €50,000.

The Georg Büchner Prize and the Nobel Prize in Literature
Five winners of the Georg Büchner Prize, Günter Grass (1965), Heinrich Böll (1967), Elias Canetti (1972), Peter Handke (1973) and Elfriede Jelinek (1998) were awarded the Nobel Prize in Literature in subsequent years. The Georg Büchner Prize is frequently seen as an indicator for potential future Nobel Prize winners writing in the German language. Most recently, however, the Swedish Academy in Stockholm preceded the German Academy for Language and Literature in awarding a prolific writer from the German sprachraum. Herta Müller received the Nobel Prize in Literature but has not yet been awarded the Georg Büchner Prize.

Recipients of the literary prize, since 1951

Recipients 1923–50 
1923  Adam Karrillon (1853–1938) and Arnold Mendelssohn (1855–1933)
1925  Wilhelm Michel (1877–1942) and Rudolf Koch (1876–1934)
1926   (1880–1954) and Wilhelm Petersen (1890–1957)
1929  Carl Zuckmayer (1896–1977) and Adam Antes (1891–1984)
1933–44 not given
1945  Hans Schiebelhuth (1895–1944)
1946  Fritz Usinger (1895–1982)
1947  Anna Seghers (1900–83)
1948  Hermann Heiss (1897–1967)
1949   (1895–1984)
1950  Elisabeth Langgässer (1899–1950)

See also
 German literature
 List of literary awards
 Sigmund Freud Prize

Notes

External links
Georg-Büchner-Preis, official site 

Buchner
Awards established in 1923
 
1923 establishments in Germany